Opisthotropis hungtai, Hung-Ta Chang's mountain keelback,  is a species of natricine snake found in China.

References

Opisthotropis
Reptiles described in 2020
Reptiles of China